Richard Gilmour (September 28, 1824 – April 13, 1891) was a Scottish-born prelate of the Roman Catholic Church. He served as bishop of the Diocese of Cleveland in Ohio from 1872 until his death in 1891.

Biography

Early life 
Gilmour was born in Dumbarton, Scotland to John and Marian (née Callander) Gilmour, both Reformed Presbyterians. In 1829, the family immigrated to Nova Scotia in Canada, but later settled near Latrobe, Pennsylvania. He received his classical education in Philadelphia, where he became acquainted with Rev. Patrick Rafferty, pastor of St. Francis Xavier Parish.

Gilmour's friendship with Rafferty led Gilmour to convert to Catholicism in 1844, and he soon decided to enter the priesthood. In 1846, he entered Mount St. Mary's Seminary in Emmitsburg, Maryland. In addition to his studies, Gilmour was named prefect of collegians and professor of mathematics in 1847. He received his Master of Arts degree in 1848.

Priesthood 
Gilmour was ordained a priest for the Diocese of Cincinnati by Archbishop John Purcell on August 30, 1852. After his ordination, Gilmour was appointed pastor of Church of Nativity of our Lord Jesus Christ Parish in Portsmouth, Ohio. He organized and built the English speaking Catholic church, Holy Redeemer in Portsmouth in 1853. Gilmour also conducted missionary work in Ironton, Gallipolis, Vinton, and Wilkesville, all in Ohio. He helped organize St. Lawrence Parish in Ironton and construct its church.

In 1857, Gilmour was appointed pastor of St. Patrick's Parish in Cincinnati, where he erected a parochial school. He served as a professor at Mount St. Mary's Seminary of the West in Cincinnati from 1868 to 1869 before being named pastor of St. Joseph's Parish in Dayton, Ohio.

Bishop of Cleveland 
On February 15, 1872, Gilmour was appointed as the second bishop of the Diocese of Cleveland by Pope Pius IX. He received his episcopal consecration on April 14, 1872, from Archbishop Purcell, with Bishops Augustus Toebbe and Caspar Borgess serving as co-consecrators, at St. Peter's Cathedral in Cincinnati.

As bishop, Gilmour founded The Catholic Universe newspaper in 1874. In 1877, the Cuyahoga County auditor announced plans to tax Catholic churches and schools.  Gilmour fought the auditor in court, winning his case six years later. He was also wary of the public school system. He established St. Ann's Asylum and Maternity Home, St. Michael Hospital, and St. John Hospital.

In 1882, Gilmour condemned the Ladies Land League chapter in Cleveland.. Founded in Ireland, the League was a women's organization that assisted tenants being evicted from their homes.

Death and legacy 
Due to his declining health, Gilmour went to St. Augustine, Florida in March 1891 to recuperate.  Richard Gilmour died there at age 66 on April 13, 1891.Gilmour Academy in Gates Mills, Ohio, is named in honor of Gilmour.

References

1824 births
1891 deaths
People from Dumbarton
People from Latrobe, Pennsylvania
Converts to Roman Catholicism from Calvinism
Roman Catholic Archdiocese of Cincinnati
Christianity in Cleveland
19th-century Roman Catholic bishops in the United States
Roman Catholic bishops of Cleveland
British emigrants to the United States
Catholics from Pennsylvania